Sagtindan is a mountain on the border of Sel Municipality and Dovre Municipality in Innlandet county, Norway. The mountain is surrounded by several other notable mountains including Veslesmeden, Storsmeden, and Trolltinden to the northeast; Ljosåbelgen and Bråkdalsbelgen to the southeast; Gråhøe and Indre Bråkdalshøe to the northwest, and Vassberget to the north.

The mountain has a second, lower peak to the northwest of the main peak. This second peak reaches .

See also
List of mountains of Norway

References

Dovre
Sel
Mountains of Innlandet